Clwb Pel-Droed Dyffryn Banw Football Club are a Welsh football team who play at Cae Morfa, Llangadfan. The team currently play in the Mid Wales Football League West DivisionCentral Wales League Northern Division.

Honours

Montgomeryshire Football League 1st Division – Winners: 2007–08
Montgomeryshire Football League 1st Division – Runners-up: 2004–05, 2005–06
Montgomeryshire Football League 2nd Division – Runners-up: 1996–97
Montgomeryshire Football League League Cup – Winners: 2001–02
Montgomeryshire Football League League Cup – Runners-up: 2004–05, 2007–08
Village Cup – Winners:  1998–99
Village Cup – Runners Up: 2001–02, 2007–08
Mike Harris Cup – Winners: 2005–06, 2007–08
Derek Mills Cup – Winners: 1995–96
Consolation Cup – Runners Up: 1995–96
Llanfechain K.O – Winners: 2004
Llanfechain K.O – Runners Up: 2006
Bishops Castle Challenge Cup – Winners: 1997 
Bishops Castle Challenge Cup – Runners Up: 1998

Current First Team Squad

Staff 

 Chairman:  Barry Smith
 Treasurer:  Gerallt Davies
 Club Secretary:   Gerallt Evans

External links
 Official Website

Football clubs in Wales
Mid Wales Football League clubs
Sport in Powys
Montgomeryshire Football League clubs